Navid Faridi (born 14 July 1977) is an Iranian former footballer and current coach. He was previous manager of Esteghlal F.C. U-19 in Iran Pro League until 2020 and recently he is the founder and current manager of Al-Najma Al-Zarqaa Football Academy in the United Arab Emirates.

Playing career
He started his playing career with Payam Tehran, continued with Saipa,
and joined Esteghlal later, when Amir Ghalenoei was the team manager. He ended his playing career with Masafi Club in the UAE.

Managerial career
Navid started his managerial career with Esteghlal Alborz in 2014,  and became coach of Damash Tehran in 2017. He joined Esteghlal Team U-15
for season 2017-2018 and U-19 team for 2018–2019. He was coach of Esteghlal F.C. U-16 with Alireza Akbarpour in Esteghlal F.C.Academy for season 2018-2019 and recently is founder and current manager of Al-Najma Al-Zarqaa Football Academy  in Dubai, UAE.

References

1977 births
Living people
Iranian footballers
Iranian expatriate footballers
Iranian football managers
Association football midfielders
Saipa F.C. players
Esteghlal F.C. players
Masafi Club players
Persian Gulf Pro League players
UAE First Division League players
Expatriate footballers in the United Arab Emirates
Iranian expatriate sportspeople in the United Arab Emirates
People from Shiraz
Sportspeople from Fars province